De frie Danske was a Danish resistance newspaper published in Copenhagen about monthly from December 1941 to 24 May 1945. It was the first Danish non-communist resistance newspaper and the first to bring photographs and also one of the largest with final issues reaching a circulation of 20,000. Especially notable was the June 1944 Invasion Issue titled 'The Free Danes Welcome our Allied Friends' with a four colored front-page photo of one US and one British rifleman each in front of their national flags.

In popular culture
The newspaper appears in Lois Lowry's historical novel Number the Stars.

References

External links

1941 establishments in Denmark
1945 disestablishments in Denmark
Danish-language newspapers
Danish resistance movement
Defunct newspapers published in Denmark
Newspapers published in Copenhagen
Newspapers established in 1941
Publications disestablished in 1945
Underground press in World War II
Monthly newspapers